The Blake number in fluid mechanics is a nondimensional number showing the ratio of inertial force to viscous force.
It is used in momentum transfer in general and in particular for flow of a fluid through beds of solids. It is a generalisation of the Reynolds number for flow through porous media.

Expressed mathematically the Blake number  is:

 

where 

{| style="border:0px"
|  || = || void fraction
|-
|  || = || dynamic viscosity
|-
|  || = || fluid density
|-
|  || = || hydraulic diameter
|-
|  || = || flow velocity
|}

External links
 

Fluid dynamics
Porous media
Dimensionless numbers